Sleeping with Sirens is an American rock band from Orlando, Florida, currently residing in Grand Rapids, Michigan. The band currently consists of Kellin Quinn (lead vocals, keyboards), touring lead guitarist Tony Pizzuti, Nick Martin (rhythm guitar, backing vocals), Justin Hills (bass guitar, backing vocals) and Matty Best (drums, percussion). The band was formed in 2009 by members of For All We Know and Paddock Park. The group is currently signed to Sumerian Records and have released six full-length albums and an acoustic EP.

The band rose to fame with their song "If I'm James Dean, You're Audrey Hepburn", the lead single from their debut album, With Ears to See and Eyes to Hear, which was released in 2010. Their second album, Let's Cheers to This, was released in 2011 and became a breakout for the band, thanks to the popular single "If You Can't Hang", which was certified Gold on July 18, 2018, by the Recording Industry Association of America (RIAA) for selling 500,000 copies in the US. The group's third album, Feel, debuted at No. 3 on the US Billboard 200, and a fourth album, entitled Madness, was released on March 17, 2015, through Epitaph Records and spawned the single "Kick Me". Their fifth studio album, Gossip, was released on September 22, 2017, on Warner Bros. Records. Their sixth studio album, How It Feels to Be Lost, was released on September 6, 2019, through Sumerian Records. The group is known primarily for the versatility of vocalist Kellin Quinn's leggero tenor vocal range, along with the heavy sound used on their early work and the pop influences they used later into their career.

History

With Ears to See and Eyes to Hear (2009–2010)
The band's first album, With Ears to See and Eyes to Hear, was released on March 23, 2010. It debuted at number 7 on Billboards Top Heatseekers chart and at number 36 on Top Independent Albums. The album spawned three singles. One of those singles, "If I'm James Dean, You're Audrey Hepburn" earned the band much recognition, and on July 18, 2018, the single was certified gold by the RIAA after 500,000 copies were sold in the US.

Let's Cheers to This (2011–2012)
On April 7, 2011, the band released "Do It Now Remember It Later", the first single off of the band's new album. Later in the month on April 28, the next single "Fire" was released. The band's second album Let's Cheers to This was released on May 10, 2011.
On June 26, 2012, the band released its first acoustic EP, If You Were a Movie, This Would Be Your Soundtrack.
On October 21, 2012, Sleeping with Sirens released a new single called "Dead Walker Texas Ranger" as a Halloween special.

Feel (2013–2014)
In January 2013, the band entered the studio to record its follow up to Let's Cheers to This with an estimated release date of mid-2013. On April 23, 2013, the band released a new single called "Low" and revealed the new album's title as Feel and release date as June 4, 2013. In support of the new album, the band will be playing Kia main stage at the Vans Warped Tour 2013. On May 21, the band released the second single from Feel, "Alone" Featuring Machine Gun Kelly.

On August 4, the band announced that it would be headlining a tour titled the Feel This Tour in support of the album Feel. Memphis May Fire, Breathe Carolina, Issues, and Our Last Night supported the tour on selected dates.

On October 16, 2013, guitarist Jesse Lawson announced his departure from the band, citing his desire to spend more time with his family and start a new musical venture. After Lawson's amicable departure the band tapped Nick Martin (formerly of D.R.U.G.S. and Underminded) to fill in on guitar on the band's upcoming UK/EU Feel tour.

Madness (2014–2016)
On July 6, 2014, the band released pictures of the band members in the studio recording new music with John Feldmann. On July 21, 2014, the band announced that it would be headlining a world tour alongside Pierce the Veil, with supporting acts Beartooth and This Wild Life. On August 8, 2014, the band members announced that the band had parted ways with Rise Records and working on as an independent band. However, on November 10, 2014, it was announced on Alternative Press that the band signed to Epitaph Records and released a new single called "Kick Me". The band followed the release of "Kick Me", with its single "We Like It Loud", on New Year's Day. It was available for free download for twenty four hours through the band's website.

Gossip (2017–2019)
The band's next album, Gossip was released on September 22, 2017. They began their worldwide, Up Close and Personal Gossip tour, in October 2017 with special guests The White Noise, Palaye Royale and Chase Atlantic. Starting in May 2018, Sleeping with Sirens began the European leg of the tour with Chase Atlantic and Chapel.

How It Feels to Be Lost (2019–2021)
On June 19, 2019, the band released the single "Leave It All Behind", which is closer to their older sound than the poppier sound of Gossip, and announced their sixth studio album, How It Feels to Be Lost. It will be the band's first release under Sumerian Records. On July 19, 2019, the band released the album's second single, "Break Me Down." On August 8, 2019, the band released the album's third single, "Agree to Disagree."

Longtime drummer Gabe Barham departed the band on September 1, 2019. Shortly after, it was announced that Matty Best (of Tonight Alive) would be taking over drumming duties for the band.

On April 9, 2020, lead guitarist Jack Fowler teased a short clip from a heavy and yet-to-be-released song.

On July 24, 2020, band released a new single that Jack Fowler teased before, "Talking to Myself", with an accompanying lyric video. The band announced the release of a deluxe version of the album "How It Feels To Be Lost", which came out on August 21, 2020.

Complete Collapse (2021–present)
On June 2, 2021, the band released the single "Bloody Knuckles" from their upcoming album. On June 22, 2022, the band released their second single called "Crosses" featuring Spencer Chamberlain from Underoath whilst also announcing their seventh studio album Complete Collapse, which was released on October 14, 2022.

On July 14, 2022, guitarist Jack Fowler announced he had departed the band.

On August 11, 2022, the band released two singles "Let You Down" featuring Charlotte Sands and "Ctrl + Alt + Del".

Musical style
The band's music has been described as post-hardcore, pop rock, metalcore, alternative rock, pop punk, pop, screamo, emo, and post-emo.

Band members

Current members
 Kellin Quinn – lead vocals, keyboards (2009–present)
 Justin Hills – bass guitar, backing vocals (2009–present)
 Nick Martin – rhythm guitar, backing vocals (2013–present)
 Matty Best – drums, percussion (2019–present)

Current touring members
 Tony Pizzuti - lead guitar (2022–present)

Former members
 Brian Calzini – lead vocals (2009)
 Dave Aguliar – rhythm guitar (2009), backing vocals (2009)
 Paul Russell – bass guitar (2009), backing vocals (2009)
 Alex Kaladjian – drums, percussion (2009)
 Nick Trombino – rhythm guitar, backing vocals (2009–2010)
 Brandon McMaster – lead guitar (2009–2010), backing vocals (2009–2010)
 Jesse Lawson – rhythm guitar, backing vocals (2010–2013)
 Gabe Barham – drums, percussion (2009–2019)
 Jack Fowler – lead guitar (2010–2022), programming (2014–2022)

Timeline

Discography

Studio albums
 With Ears to See and Eyes to Hear (2010)
 Let's Cheers to This (2011)
 Feel (2013)
 Madness (2015)
 Gossip (2017)
 How It Feels to Be Lost (2019)
 Complete Collapse (2022)

Awards and nominations

Alternative Press Music Awards

iHeartRadio Music Awards

Kerrang Music Awards

References

External links

American post-hardcore musical groups
Metalcore musical groups from Florida
American alternative rock groups
American pop rock music groups
Alternative rock groups from Florida
Musical groups established in 2009
Rise Records artists
Epitaph Records artists
Warner Records artists
Musical groups from Orlando, Florida
2009 establishments in Florida
Rock music groups from Michigan
Musical groups from Grand Rapids, Michigan
Emo musical groups
American punk rock groups